is a Japanese politician of the Liberal Democratic Party, a member of the House of Representatives in the Diet (national legislature). A native of Isehara, Kanagawa and graduate of Keio University, he was elected for the first time in 2006.

Prior to be in politics, he worked for Industrial Bank of Japan and Boston Consulting Group.

References

External links 
 Official website in Japanese.

1971 births
Boston Consulting Group people
Keio University alumni
Koizumi Children
Liberal Democratic Party (Japan) politicians
Living people
Members of the House of Representatives (Japan)
People from Isehara, Kanagawa
Politicians from Kanagawa Prefecture